Marcial de Mello Castro (3 June 1941 – 2 August 2018) was a Brazilian footballer. He played in six matches for the Brazil national football team in 1963. He was also part of Brazil's squad for the 1963 South American Championship.

References

External links
 

1941 births
2018 deaths
Brazilian footballers
Brazil international footballers
Association football goalkeepers
Sportspeople from Minas Gerais